Bernard Ifeanyi Odoh (born 5 August 1975) is a Nigerian Politician and Professor of Applied Geophysics. He is currently the gubernatorial nominee of the All Progressives Grand Alliance in Ebonyi State.

Education and career

Odoh started his early primary school at Ezza Road Primary School and thereafter obtained his SSCE from Special Science School, Igbeagu Abakaliki, Ebonyi State, in 1994. He proceeded toobtaina B.Sc. in Geological Sciences(1999), MSc in Applied Geophysics,(2006), and a PhD (2008) in Applied Geophysics (Geoelectrical Geophysics) all from Nnamdi Azikiwe University, Awka. Odoh joined the academia in 2002 and was appointed a professor of Applied Geophysics in the year 2014 Nnamdi Azikiwe University, Awka. He also lectured at Ebonyi State University, Abakaliki from March 2002 – September 2009, Nnamdi Azikiwe University, Awka between September 2009 to August 2014, and was a researcher with the Society of Exploration Geophysics (SEG)at Oklahoma USA, 2006, 2007, 2008 and 2011. His research in this area provided economic decision-making tools towards reducing failures: in groundwater exploitation; solid mineral exploitation; reservoir characterization and prospect mapping for World Bank Community Water Projects, Anambra Imo River Basin. He is a member of the Society of Exploration Geophysics, Oklahoma, USA, American Association of Petroleum Geologists, USA, European Association of Geoscientists & Engineers, London, and Nigeria Association of Petroleum Explorations, Lagos. He is also a member of the Nigerian Mining and Geosciences Society, Abuja.

Political career

Odoh began his political career when he contested for the Ebonyi Central senatorial position on the platform of the All Progressives Grand Alliance (APGA) in the 2015 Nigerian general elections but lost to Senator Obinna Ogba of the People's Democratic Party(PDP). He was appointed the Secretary to the State Government of Ebonyi State in May 2015 by the Governor of Ebonyi State, Dave Umahi.  He resigned from the Executive Council In April 2018 for reasons of maladministration by Governor Dave Umahi. He subsequently contested for the 2019 Ebonyi Governorship election under the All Progressives Congress but lost in the primaries to Sonni Ogbuoji .

In 2022, Odoh defected from the All Progressives Congress back to the All Progressives Grand Alliance and subsequently won the gubernatorial ticket to become the nominee for the All Progressives Grand Alliance in the 2023 Ebonyi State gubernatorial election.

Appointments and public positions held

 Odoh was appointed Secretary to Ebonyi State Government between May 2015 and April 2018
 Chairman CBN Anchor-Borrowers Program to boost rice production in Nigeria, 2016
 Visiting Professor to Federal University Gusau, July 2014.

Projects

Odoh was awarded the Tertiary Educational Trust Fund 2012 research grant for investigating the geological and geochemical origin of Okposi-Uburu Salt Lakes; geotechnical investigation for characterizing subsurface geology, Ebonyi State, Nigeria. He was also awarded the Society of Exploration Geophysics (SEG) Oklahoma USA, 2011 grant for geoelectrical sounding and hydrogeochemical studies for delineating groundwater contamination of acid mine drainage at Okpara Mine site, Enugu, Southeastern Nigeria, and Society of Exploration Geophysics/TGS Field Camp Project Grant in support of the project "Investigation of Toxic Waste Sites and Buried Fuel Tanks Using Spontaneous Potential Method" 2009. Other projects headed by Odohinclude the Society of Exploration Geophysics Projectin support of Pb-Zn Exploration in Abakaliki using Spontaneous Potential, 2008 and Society of Exploration Geophysics Project onHydrogeophysical mapping of the Abakaliki shale aquifers, 2007.

References

Nigerian politicians
1975 births
Living people
Nigerian academics
Nigerian geophysicists
Politicians from Ebonyi State